Norman E. Bowie (born 1942) is professor emeritus at the University of Minnesota. Until his retirement in 2009 he was Elmer L Andersen Chair of Corporate Responsibility and served in the departments of strategic management and of philosophy. 
He is an important voice in ongoing debates over business ethics, in which his own voice has been in favor of the Kantian view of ethics (in business as elsewhere) as a Kingdom of Ends.

List of books

 1971 Towards A New Theory of Distributive Justice, University of Massachusetts Press Translated into Spanish, 1972.
 1981 Ethical Issues in Government, Editor, Temple University Press
 1982   Ethics, Public Policy, and Criminal Justice, Co-editor with Frederick Elliston, Oelgeschlager, Gunn & Hain Publishers
 1983 Ethical Theory in the Last Quarter of the 20th Century, Editor, Hackett
 1985 Making Ethical Decisions, Editor, McGraw-Hill Book Co.
 1986  The Tradition of Philosophy, Co-editor with Harrison Hall, Wadsworth Publishing Company
 1988 Equal Opportunity, Editor, Westview Press
 1990   Business Ethics, Prentice Hall.  Second Edition, Co-author with Ronald Duska,  A selection has been reprinted as "Criteria for Government Regulations"  Ethical Issues in Business, Michael Boylan, Editor, Harcourt Brace, 1995, pp. 434–439. First Edition single authored 1982
 1992 Ethics and Agency Theory, Co-editor with R. Edward Freeman, Oxford University Press
 1994 University-Business Partnerships: An Assessment, Rowman and Littlefield. An article based on Chapter 5, "The Clash Between Academic Values and Business Values," appeared in Business & Professional Ethics Journal, Vol. XII, 1993, pp.3–19
 1999   Business Ethics A Kantian Perspective, Blackwell Publishers: Also published in Chinese by the Shanghai Academy of Social Sciences. Also published in Japanese by Koyoshobo Publishers 2008
 2002  Guide to Business Ethics, Editor  Blackwell Publishers
 2005 Ethical Marketing  with Patrick E. Murphy, Gene R. Lazniak, and Thomas A Klein Pearson Prentice Hall, also in initial Prentice Hall SafariX Series. Translated into Chinese, Peking University Press.
 2005 Management Ethics with contributions from Patricia H. Werhane. Blackwell Publishers, to be translated into Chinese and published by Economic Management Publishing House. To be translated into Japanese. Publisher Koyo Shobo
 2008    The Individual and the Political Order: An Introduction to Social and Political Philosophy, Fourth Edition Co-authored with Robert Simon, Rowman and Littlefield Third Edition 1998,  Second edition, 1985, Prentice Hall, First  Edition 1977. Prentice Hall
 2008   Ethical Theory and Business, Eighth Edition Co-editor with Tom Beauchamp and Denis Arnold, Prentice- Hall. First Edition, 1977 Second Edition, 1983 .Third Edition, 1988 Translated into Japanese. Fourth Edition, 1993. Fifth Edition, 1997. Sixth Edition 2001. Seventh Edition 2003. Ninth Edition 2013
 2011    Business Ethics for Dummies with Meg Schneider Wiley
 2013   Business Ethics in the 21st Century. Springer Books.

External links
Faculty profile at Carlson School of Management, University of Minnesota

1942 births
Living people
University of Minnesota faculty